The Labor Day brush fire was a small brush fire that burned parts of Rancho Peñasquitos and Black Mountain Open Space Park in September 2005, during the 2005 California wildfire season. Despite its small size, the brush fire was the worst wildfire to affect San Diego City in two years, since the Cedar Fire of 2003. The wildfire resulted in 6 injuries, but did not result in structural damages. The brush fire was determined to have been started by a teenage boy, who was subsequently arrested.

The fire
On Labor Day Monday, September 5, 2005, at around 12:55 PM PDT, at brush fire was reported in a field behind Mount Carmel High School, in Rancho Peñasquitos, San Diego. The brush fire also began moving towards some nearby homes in Rancho Peñasquitos, resulting in the evacuation of 200 homes in Rancho Peñasquitos. This was the first time that a wildfire had burned into San Diego City, and the Rancho Peñasquitos area, since the Cedar Fire in 2003. In September 2005, this brush fire was said to have been "the worst fire that the [San Diego Fire Department] responded to since the Cedar Fire", due to the fire's proximity to so many homes. Firefighters were able to quickly stop the spread of the brush fire, with 40% containment of the fire by the evening of the same day, and residents were allowed to return to their homes that evening. Containment of the fire increased to 90% by Tuesday evening, on September 6. By September 7, the brush fire was fully extinguished. 

Six people were injured in relation to the brush fire; a traffic accident between an SUV and a firefighting vehicle sent 5 civilians to the hospital, and a firefighter was treated for heat exhaustion on September 5. The Labor Day brush fire was determined to have been caused by a teenage boy, who was arrested on charges of arson. His name was not released to the public, due to his age.

See also
Cedar Fire (2003)
October 2007 California wildfires
Witch Fire
May 2014 San Diego County wildfires
2016 California wildfires

References

2005 California wildfires
Wildfires in San Diego County, California
September 2005 events in the United States
California wildfires caused by arson